Rockovnik (trans. Chrocknicle) is a forty-episode documentary aired on Radio Television of Serbia in 2011, written by Sandra Rančić and Dušan Vesić and directed by Vesić. The series focuses on the history of former Yugoslav rock scene from its beginnings in the late 1950s until the year 2000. The name of the show is a bilingual pun based on the words "rock" and "rokovnik" (Serbian for planner).

Summary
The show features the Led Zeppelin song "Rock and Roll" as the opening theme.

The first ten episodes deal with the late 1950s and the 1960s in Yugoslav rock music, the next ten episodes with the 1970s, and the following ten with the 1980s. The last ten episodes deal with the period from the beginning of Yugoslav Wars and the breakup of Yugoslavia to the 2000 political changes in Serbia, and, as with the dissolution of the country the Yugoslav rock scene ceased to exist, mostly with the Serbian rock scene.

Every episode features a small list of events, both political and cultural, that happened during a certain year.

Recording
The first recordings were made at the end of the 1990s, but most of the recording took place during 2004, in Belgrade, Zagreb, Ljubljana, Sarajevo, Rijeka, Pula, Kumrovec, Kragujevac and Novi Sad.

Episodes

Interviews
The show features interviews with more than 300 personalities, mostly musicians, but also critics, journalists, fans, and others.

Musicians
Miroslav "Miša" Aleksić (Riblja Čorba)
Nebojša Antonijević "Anton" (Partibrejkers)
Boris Aranđelović (Smak)
Boris Babarović "Barba" (Crveni Koralji)
Biljana Babić (Boye)
Branislav Babić "Kebra" (Obojeni Program)
Momčilo Bajagić "Bajaga" (Riblja Čorba, Bajaga i Instruktori)
Željko Bebek (Bijelo Dugme, solo artist)
Neno Belan (Đavoli, solo artist)
Josip Boček (Dinamiti, Korni Grupa)
Davorin Bogović (Prljavo Kazalište, solo artist)
Branislav "Bane" Bojović (Sunshine)
Janez Bončina "Benč" (Mladi Levi, Srce, Jugoslovenska Pop Selekcija, September)
Vidoja "Džindžer" Božinović (Riblja Čorba)
Vedran Božić (Roboti, Mi, Time)
Lav Bratuša (Darkwood Dub)
Marko Brecelj (Buldožer, solo artist)
Goran Bregović (Bijelo Dugme)
Aleksandar Cvetković (Siluete)
Dejan Cukić (Bulevar, Bajaga i Instruktori, solo artist)
Miroslav Cvetković "Cvele" (Bajaga i Instruktori)
Samir  Ćeremida "Ćera I" (Plavi Orkestar)
Zdravko Čolić (Ambasadori, Korni Grupa, solo artist)
Branko Črnac Tusta (KUD Idijoti)
Nikola Čuturilo "Čutura" (Riblja Čorba, solo artist)
Žarko Dančuo (Roboti, solo artist)
Zoran Dašić (Legende)
Milan Delčić "Delča" (U Škripcu, solo artist)
Vladimir Divljan (Idoli, solo artist)
Nebojša Drakula (Direktori)
Bora Đorđević (Suncokret, Rani Mraz, Riblja Čorba)
Ivan Đorđević "Ivek" (Kazna Za Uši)
Vojislav Đukić (S Vremena Na Vreme)
Zvonimir Đukić "Đule" (Van Gogh)
Dragoljub Đuričić (YU Grupa, Leb i Sol, Kerber, Zdravko Čolić backing band)
Mahmut Ferović (Čičak)
Robert Funčić (Xenia)
Vladimir Furduj (Korni Grupa)
Milan "Miki" Gelb (Bijele Strijele)
Davor Gobac (Psihomodo Pop)
Vladimir "Vlajko" Golubović (Suncokret, Riblja Čorba, Bajaga i Instruktori)
Srđan Gojković "Gile" (Električni Orgazam)
Roman Goršek (Plejboj)
Dejan Gvozden (Kristali)
Husein Hasanefendić "Hus" (Grupa 220, Parni Valjak)
Bojan Hreljac (Korni Grupa)
Dragan Ilić (Generacija 5)
Marko Ilić (CYA)
Sanja Ilić (San, solo artist)
Alen Islamović (Divlje Jagode, Bijelo Dugme, solo artist)
Žan Jakopač (Pozdrav Azri)
Dražen Janković "Drale" (Zabranjeno Pušenje, The No Smoking Orchestra)
Vladimir Janković "Džet" (Crni Biseri, Tunel)
Dragi Jelić (Siluete, Džentlmeni, YU Grupa)
Živorad "Žika" Jelić (Džentlmeni, YU Grupa)
Vladimir Jerić "Jera" (Darkwood Dub)
Dragan "Krle" Jovanović (Generacija 5)
Miodrag Jovanović "Miško" (Ništa Ali Logopedi)
Milutin Jovančić "Mita" (Block Out)
Jovan Jović (Deca Loših Muzičara)
Tanja Jovićević (Oktobar 1864)
Nele Karajlić (Zabranjeno Pušenje, The No Smoking Orchestra)
Valter Kocijančić (Paraf)
Nemanja Kojić "Kojot" (Eyesburn, Sunshine)
Vlada Kokotović (Goblini)
Zoran Kostić "Cane" (Partibrejkers)
Kornelije Kovač (Indexi, Korni Grupa)
Kristina Kovač (K2)
Sreten "Sreta" Kovačević (Pekinška Patka, Kontraritam)
Bruno Langer (Atomsko Sklonište)
Boris Leiner (Azra, Vještice)
Sead "Zele" Lipovača (Divlje Jagode)
Mile Lojpur
Aleksandar "Saša" Lokner (Galija, Bajaga i Instruktori)
Saša Lošić "Loša" (Plavi Orkestar)
Peter "Pero" Lovšin (Pankrti, Sokoli, solo artist)
Davor Lukas (Fit)
Aleksandar Lukić "Luka" (U Škripcu, Familija)
Goran Marić (Bjesovi)
Srđan Marić "Mara" (Direktori)
Zoran Marinković (Bjesovi)
Nenad Marjanović "dr Fric" (KUD Idijoti)
Srđan Marjanović
Dragoljub Marković "Bleki" (Ništa Ali Logopedi)
Željko Markuš (Kristali)
Damir Martinović "Mrle" (Termiti, Let 3)
Radomir Mihajlović "Točak" (Smak, solo artist)
Zoran Milanović (Smak)
Miroslav "Vicko" Milatović (Riblja Čorba)
Žika Milenković (Bajaga i Instruktori, Babe)
Dejan Milojević (Dža ili Bu)
Marko Milivojević (Ekatarina Velika)
Aleksandra "Slađana" Milošević
Aleksandar Milovanović "Sale Veruda" (KUD Idijoti)
Jovan Mišević (Siluete)
Drago Mlinarec (Grupa 220, solo artist)
Kemal Monteno
Oliver Nektarijević (Kanda, Kodža i Nebojša)
Robert Nemeček (Pop Mašina)
Walter Neugebauer (Mladi)
Ljubomir "Ljuba" Ninković (S Vremena Na Vreme)
Ivan "Jani" Novak (Laibach)
Boris Novković
Đorđe Novković (Indexi, Pro Arte)
Jurica Pađen (Grupa 220, Aerodrom, Azra, 4 Asa)
Dejan Pejović "Peja" (Familija)
Nenad Pejović (Kanda, Kodža i Nebojša)
Marina Perazić (Denis & Denis, solo artist)
Igor Perović (Plejboj)
Goran Petranović "Rizo" (Elvis J. Kurtovich & His Meteors)
Aleksandar Petrović "Alek" (Eyesburn)
Branislav Petrović "Banana" (Električni Orgazam)
Branko Požgajec (Drugi Način)
Zoran Predin (Lačni Franz, solo artist)
Zoran Prodanović "Prlja" (Let 3)
Vlada Rajović (Kanda, Kodža i Nebojša)
Ivan Ranković "Raka" (Tvrdo Srce i Velike Uši, Ekatarina Velika)
Goran Redžepi "Gedža" (Familija)
Zoran Redžić (Bijelo Dugme)
Miodrag Ristić "Miki" (Darkwood Dub)
Laza Ristovski (Smak, Bijelo Dugme, solo artist)
Vladimir Rubčić (Bijele Strijele)
Darko Rundek (Haustor, solo artist)
Vladimir Savčić "Čobi" (Pro Arte)
Massimo Savić (Dorian Gray, solo artist)
Aleksandar Siljanovski "Silja" (Deca Loših Muzičara)
Nebojša Simeunović "Sabljar" (Dža ili Bu)
Jasmina "Nina" Simić (Cacadou Look)
Tatjana "Tanja" Simić (Cacadou Look)
Vojislav Simić
Sejo Sexon (Zabranjeno Pušenje)
Ana Stanić
Mirko Srdić (Elvis J. Kurtovich & His Meteors)
Ivan "Piko" Stančić (Grupa 220, Parni Valjak, Film, Le Cinema)
Slobodan "Boba" Stefanović (Zlatni Dečaci, solo artist)
Vladimir "Vlatko" Stefanovski (Leb i Sol, solo artist)
Slobodan Stojanović "Kepa" (Smak)
Jurisav "Jura" Stublić (Film)
Siniša Škarica (Mi)
Davor Tolja (Denis & Denis)
Dado Topić (Dinamiti, Korni Grupa, Time, solo artist)
Predrag "Peđa" Tošović (Direktori)
Aleksandar Vasiljević "Vasa" (U Škripcu, Košava, Familija)
Goran Vejvoda
Viktorija
Mladen Vojičić "Tifa" (Bijelo Dugme, Divlje Jagode, Vatreni Poljubac, solo artist)
Voodoo Popeye
Mladen "Bata" Vranešević (Laboratorija Zvuka)
Predrag "Peđa" Vranešević (Laboratorija Zvuka)
Nikola Vranjković (Block Out)
Zoran Vulović "Vule" (U Škripcu)
Milić Vukašinović (Indexi, Bijelo Dugme, Vatreni Poljubac, solo artist)
Saša Zalepugin Jr. (La Fortunjeros)
Zigi (Dža ili Bu)
Dražen Žerić "Žera" (Crvena Jabuka)
Zoran Živković "Žika" (Deca Loših Muzičara)

Others
Branislav Antović - Music Television of Serbia manager
Želimir Altarac Čičak - art manager, journalist
Voja Aralica - producer
Dejan Bodiroga - basketball player
Branislav Cvetković - journalist
Jovan Ćirilov - theatre expert, writer
Srđan Dragojević - director
Dragan Džigurski - rock fan
Goga Grubješić - Superstar Agency producer
Aleksandar Ilić "Sale" - EKV Records owner
Jadranka Janković-Nešić - journalist
Zlatko Jošić - manager and concert organiser
Momo Kapor - writer
Nikola Karaklajić - chess master, radio personality
Slavoljub Knežević - Rajko Kojić's friend
Zoran Lazarević "Kiza Betmen" - author of the show Paket aranžman
Bane Lokner - rock critic
Biljana Maksić - dramaturge
Radomir "Raka" Marić - manager
Višnja Marjanović - journalist
Ivan Markov - director
Dubravka "Duca" Marković - Hit meseca host
Vladimir Mihaljek "Miha" - manager
Milorad Milinković "Debeli" - director
Zoran Modli - DJ
Malkolm Muharem - manager, New Primitivism ideologue
Nikola Nešković - journalist
Biljana Nevajda - woman that inspired Riblja Čorba song "Ostani đubre do kraja"
Dragan Nikolić - actor
Predrag Novković - journalist
Dragan Papić - artist
Raša Petrović - journalist
Mladen Popović - Hit meseca editor
Nada Popović - rock fan
Petar Popović - rock critic
Momčilo Rajin - art historian, designer
Ivana Ristič - rock fan
Jovan Ristić - director
Sonja Savić - actress
Vladimir Spičanović - chronicler
Marko Stoimenov - Margita Stefanović's boyfriend
Rodoljub Stojanović "Rođa" - manager
Tanja Vdović - Ivica Vdović "Vd"'s cousin
Aleksandar Žikić - rock critic

Rockovik on YouTube
The show's official YouTube channel features all the episodes of the show. The YouTube edition features the instrumental version of Atomsko Sklonište song "Olujni mornar" ("Storm Sailor") as the opening theme.

Possible DVD release
In a 2013 interview, Sandra Rančić stated that there was a possibility for the show to be released on DVD, and that the DVD release would feature some of the unused footage.

External links
 Official YouTube channel

References

Documentary television series about music
Radio Television of Serbia original programming
Serbian rock music
Yugoslav rock music
Television shows set in Serbia
Television shows set in Belgrade
Television shows filmed in Serbia
Television shows filmed in Belgrade